The Oklahoma Girl Scout murders took place on the morning of June 13, 1977, at Camp Scott in Mayes County, Oklahoma, United States. The victims were three Girl Scouts, between the ages of 8 and 10, who were raped and murdered. The case was classified as solved when Gene Leroy Hart, a local jail escapee with a history of violence, and rape, was arrested. However, Hart was acquitted in March 1979 after a jury unanimously returned a verdict of not guilty. In 2022, it was announced that DNA testing in the case, although officially inconclusive, strongly suggests Hart’s involvement in the crime. The case remains officially unsolved.

Less than two months before the murders, during an on-site training session, a counselor at Camp Scott discovered that her belongings had been ransacked and her doughnuts had been stolen. Inside the empty doughnut box was a hand-written note, stating in capital letters, "We are on a mission to kill three girls in tent one." The director of that camp session treated the note as a prank, and it was discarded.

Discovery of the bodies 

At around 7 p.m. on Sunday, June 12, 1977, the night before camp started, the girls huddled in their tents. Among them were Lori Lee Farmer (8), Doris Denise Milner (10), and Michelle Heather Guse (9). The girls were all residents of Broken Arrow, Oklahoma, a suburb of Tulsa. They were sharing tent #7 in the camp's "Kiowa" unit which was located the farthest from the camp counselor's tent, and partially obscured by the camp’s showers. 

At around 6 a.m. on June 13, a camp counselor on her way to the shower saw a girl's body in her sleeping bag in a wooded area just outside the tent area. It was discovered that all three girls from tent #7 were missing. As counselors began searching, they discovered all three girls from tent #7 had been murdered. Two bodies were inside a sleeping bag crumpled towards the bottom of the bag, one body was visible on the outside. They had been left on a trail leading to the showers, about 150 yards from their tent. Subsequent testing showed that they had been  bludgeoned, and strangled. All three girls had been raped.

A large, red flashlight was found on top of the girls' bodies; a smudged fingerprint was found on the lens, but it has never been identified as it was too smudged for a positive identification. A footprint from a 9.5 shoe size was also found in the blood in the tent. Between 2:30 and 3 a.m. on June 13, a landowner reported hearing "quite a bit" of traffic on a remote road near the camp.

Aftermath 
Camp Scott was evacuated and was later shut down.

Suspect 
Gene Leroy Hart (November 27, 1943 – June 4, 1979) had been at large since 1973 after escaping from the Mayes County Jail. He had been convicted of kidnapping and raping two pregnant women as well as four counts of first-degree burglary. Raised about a mile from Camp Scott, Hart, a member of the Cherokee nation, was arrested within a year at the home of a Cherokee medicine man. He was represented by Garvin A. Isaacs, a local Oklahoma attorney. He was tried in March 1979. Although the local sheriff pronounced himself "one thousand percent" certain that Hart was guilty, a local jury acquitted him.  As a convicted rapist and jail escapee, Hart still had 305 years of his 308-year sentence left to serve in the Oklahoma State Penitentiary. 

On June 4, 1979, two years after the murders, Hart collapsed and died of a heart attack at the age of 35 after about an hour of lifting weights and jogging in the prison exercise yard.

Two of the families later sued the Magic Empire Council and its insurer for $5 million, alleging negligence. In 1985, by a 9–3 vote, jurors decided in favor of Magic Empire.

DNA testing 
In 1989, DNA testing was conducted that showed three of the five probes matched Hart's DNA. Statistically, DNA from 1 in 7,700 Native Americans would obtain these results. In 2008, authorities conducted new DNA testing on stains found on a pillowcase, the results of which proved inconclusive because the samples were "too deteriorated to obtain a DNA profile". In 2017, $30,000 in donations were raised by the sheriff in order to do new DNA tests using the latest advances in testing. In 2022,  authorities made public that DNA evidence strongly suggests Hart's involvement.  Sheriff Mike Reed of Mayes County said, “Unless something new comes up, something brought to light we are not aware of, I am convinced where I’m sitting of Hart’s guilt and involvement in this case.”  Reed  said the results of the DNA tests have been known since 2019, but did not go public with the findings until asked to do so by the victim's families.

Legacy 
Richard Guse, the father of one of the three victims, went on to help the state legislature pass the Oklahoma Victims' Bill of Rights. He also helped found the Oklahoma Crime Victims Compensation Board.

Another parent, Sheri Farmer, founded the Oklahoma chapter of Parents of Murdered Children, a support group.

Documentaries 
A 1993 documentary called Someone Cry for The Children : The Girl Scout Murders based on the book of the same name by Michael and Dick Wilkerson was released. The documentary is narrated by Dale Robertson and Johnny Cash. It was directed by Michael Wilkerson.

A four-part ABC News documentary series, titled Keeper of the Ashes: The Oklahoma Girl Scout Murders, about the case was released on Hulu on May 24, 2022, a few weeks before the 45th anniversary of the crimes. It’s hosted by actress and singer Kristin Chenoweth, who was an 8 year-old Girl Scout in 1977 and had planned to go on the camping trip but became ill and did not attend.

See also 
 Crime in Oklahoma
 List of murdered American children
 Murder of Marcia Trimble

References

Bibliography

External links 

 "Three Girl Scouts were murdered thirty years ago" in The Oklahoman
 Voices of Oklahoma interview with Nancy McDonald. First person interview conducted on July 13, 2010, with Nancy McDonald, board member when the Girl Scout murders took place.
 40 years after the Girl Scout murders  in the Tulsa World. The World has the definitive series on the murders published June 2017.
 "Murdered Girl Scouts at Camp Scott"

1977 murders in the United States
1977 in Oklahoma
Mayes County, Oklahoma
Unsolved mass murders in the United States
Murdered American children
Deaths by beating in the United States
Deaths by strangulation in the United States
Rapes in the United States
Murder in Oklahoma
Crimes in Oklahoma
Girl Scouts of the USA
June 1977 events in the United States
June 1977 crimes
Female murder victims
Incidents of violence against girls